Örgön (also Urgen, Wide) is a sum (district) of Dornogovi Province in south-eastern Mongolia. The fluorspar mine (fluorspar is transported to the Bor-Öndör processing plant) and the railway station are the main pillars of the Örgön settlement economy. In 2009, its population was 1,816.

References 

Districts of Dornogovi Province
Mining communities in Mongolia